The Ministry of Health and Prevention (Arabic: ‘وزارة الصحة’ ) is the ministry of the Government of United Arab Emirates which is responsible for the implementation of health care policy in all areas of technical, material, and coordination with the Ministries of State, and cooperation with the private sector in health locally and internationally. The ministry is led by the minister, Abdul Rahman Mohammed Al Oweis.

References

External links
  (English)

Government of the United Arab Emirates
UAE